EPRON,  (ЭПРОН) "Special Expedition for Underwater Works" —Special-Purpose Underwater Rescue Party, was a government agency of the Soviet Union to salvage valuable cargo and equipment from sunken ships and submarines.

History
EPRON was established on 17 December 1923 and was initially under the Joint State Political Directorate at the Council of People's Commissars. Its first operation was treasure-hunting near Sevastopol for the wreckage of HMS Prince, a steamship sunk by a storm off Balaklava in November 1854 when it was carrying gold from Britain to pay British troops fighting in the Crimea (GBP 200,000).
The project team was financed, equipped, trained and managed by Japanese diving specialists, who had become highly experienced through salvaging warships of the Russian Imperial Navy sunk or scuttled during the 1904–1905 Russo-Japanese War. The wreckage was allegedly located but there were no reports of gold being found in the quantities that had been initially deemed.

After that EPRON extended its operations to rescue and salvaging sunken ships, gradually absorbing other diving units (less experienced and/or worse equipped) and creating new ones. In 1929 EPRON became the sole body in the USSR responsible for all kinds of work under water - in marine operations, hydraulic and river engineering, mining, wreckage and derelict logging and utilizing, etc.

In 1931 it was transferred from the OGPU as a department to the NKPS ( - "People's Commissariat (Ministry) of Transport"). In 1936 EPRON was subordinated to NKVT ( - "People's Commissariat (Ministry) of Sea and River Transport"); in 1939 - further to NKMF ( - "People's Commissariat (Ministry) of the Merchant Navy").

By 1941 EPRON had rescued 36 ships and raised 74 sunken ships with total weight of about 25,000 GRT.
In 1941 naval rescue and salvage units were transferred to the Soviet Navy (still under the name EPRON); in 1942 it was renamed the Emergency Rescue Service of the Navy (Аварийно-спасательная служба ВМФ), which became the Search and Emergency Rescue Service of the Navy (поисково-спасательная служба ВМФ) in 1979.

Notable commanders
Vladimir Yazykov (1923-1924) 
Lev Zakharov-Meyer (1923-1930) 
Photius Krylov (1932-1942)

References

External links
 Работа ЭПРОНа по подъему судов в северных морях
 Search and emergency rescue service of the Russian Navy being equipped with modern underwater vehicles

Defunct government agencies of Russia
Science and technology in the Soviet Union
Rescue agencies
Russian Navy
1923 establishments in Russia
1942 disestablishments in the Soviet Union
Soviet Navy